This article provides a list of fish hatcheries in Colorado.

Fish hatcheries are an important tool in the scientific world for native fish species conservation. There is an abundance of environmental impacts which have caused an expansion in the captive breeding programs to prevent the extinction of many population. Specific impacts that are protected against in hatcheries include habitat loss, pollution and more natural causes such as predation, competitors, or disease. The goal of many fish hatcheries is to preserve natural species with the intention of releasing them back into their natural habitat. 
	
Since hatcheries have a significant impact within the conservation field, there are a wide distribution and varying purpose among the facilities. In Colorado, there is a total of 18 hatcheries raising 30+ species of fish which Colorado Parks and Wildlife (CPW) operate. Twelve of these hatcheries are cold water facilities, two are warm water facilities, two are cold and warm water, and two are USFWS hatcheries. The missions of these various hatcheries vary from production for angling stock to native species recovery, with focus on fish such as cutthroat trout, rainbow trout, largemouth bass and many more.

References 

Fish hatcheries in the United States
Fish hatcheries